Eastwood Mall is an indoor shopping center in Niles/ Howland Township, Ohio.

Eastwood Mall may also refer to:
Eastwood Mall (Birmingham) or Eastwood Village, a now-demolished shopping mall in Birmingham, Alabama
Algo Centre Mall or Eastwood Mall, a now-collapsed mall in Elliot Lake, Ontario
Eastwood Mall, a development in Eastwood City By Megaworld Corporation, in, Libis, Quezon City, Philippines